Kenneth Giorgio Jackson Drago (born 6 February 1987) is a Chilean politician and engineer who has been serving as Chile's Minister of Social Development since 6 September 2022. He previously served as Ministry General Secretariat of the Presidency between March and September 2022. He is founder and first congressman of the political party Democratic Revolution, achieving the highest personal vote in the 2017 elections to the lower chamber. He was one of the leaders of the student mobilizations of 2011 and collaborated in the creation of the Chilean Broad Front and the presidential candidacy of Beatriz Sánchez.

After the mobilizations of 2011, together with social activists and other student leaders, they called for the founding of a political movement that became the Democratic Revolution party. In the 2013 parliamentary elections in Chile, he was elected as deputy for Santiago Centro. In the parliamentary elections of Chile in 2017 he was elected as deputy for the new District 10, district that includes the communes of Ñuñoa, Providencia, Santiago, Macul, San Joaquín, La Granja and he has remained for the last two years as one of the most approved politicians according to various public opinion polls. During his time as minister in the government of President Gabriel Boric the Criteria poll show a decrease in Jackson's approval ratings from 48% in March 2022 to 37% in September the same year.

Biography
He was born in Viña del Mar, Chile, on 6 February, 1987, son of Kenneth Paul Jackson Salinas and Carmen Gloria Elisa Drago Caballero. Jackson studied at the Deutsche Schule Sankt Thomas Morus, a private school located in the Santiago commune of Providencia.

In the third year of Middle School, Jackson began to participate as a volunteer in Un Techo para Chile an organization in which he would be involved for six years. During his adolescence, he had an outstanding participation in volleyball, becoming a member of the national team member for the 2004 Minors, and 2006 Youth categories.
In 2004, he graduated from secondary education to enter via the Pontifical Catholic University of Chile as a civil industrial engineering with a major in information technologies, 7 of which he graduated in 2013. In 2009 he participated in the creation of the Student and Worker Center of the Catholic University (CET), an initiative that emerged from the New University Action (NAU) movement. He was general coordinator of CET between 2009 and 2010.

Political career 
Beginnings as a university leader (2008-2011)

In 2008, Jackson joined the student movement center-left, New University Action, NAU. In addition, together with various organizations. As a leader, he integrated the development commissions for the Propedeutic UC, a proposal for the access of vulnerable students and participated in the negotiation against the increase of tariffs in 2009.

During 2010, Jackson was territorial advisor of Engineering, participating in the advisory team of the blind access pilot plan at the Engineering Faculty, together with the Social Responsibility in Engineering Directorate. In November 2010, the NAU faced the rightwing  Gremialist Movement in the second round, after obtaining 33.9% of the votes in the first round. The result of the ballot gave the victory to NAU with 51.6% of the votes.

As president of the Student Federation of the Catholic University, Jackson was one of the main leaders of the student movement during 2011 along with his homonyms of the Student Federation of the University of Chile, Camila Vallejo, and the Federation of Students of the University of Santiago de Chile, Camilo Ballesteros. In his role as spokesperson of the Confederation of Students of Chile (Confech) was one of the most critical to the proposals of the government of Sebastián Piñera, even though he belonged to one of the most moderate lines within the claimants.

Jackson intervened in various official meetings, one of the most important of which was held in front of the Education Commission of the Senate of Chile, where he described as "a moral imperative that the State be a guarantor of rights and not consumer goods". He also made a trip to Europe together with Camila Vallejo and Francisco Figueroa, where they spoke to the United Nations Educational, Scientific and Cultural Organization (Unesco) and met with the intellectuals Stéphane Hessel and Edgar Morin.

In this context, he was one of the public figures best evaluated by citizens in 2011, reaching 73% of support.

Jackson avoided referring to a future political career during the mobilizations of 2011, stating that it was not within his immediate plans. However, on January 7, 2012 he launched a political movement called the Democratic Revolution.

In December 2012, he announced that he would run as a candidate for deputy for Santiago in the 2013 parliamentary elections. Although he ran as an independent candidate, he was supported by the Nueva Mayoría centre-left parties, which decided not to have candidates for the district. Jackson chose to have a campaign funded exclusively by his adherents, excluding corporative and secret donations. On November 17, he was elected deputy with 48.17% of the votes of his district. Jackson is one of the four student leaders who were elected deputies in those elections, along with Camila Vallejo, Gabriel Boric and Karol Cariola. On November 21, he declared his support for the candidacy of Michelle Bachelet on behalf of the Democratic Revolution party.

Deputy and Broad Front (2014-present) 

He assumed as deputy on March 11, 2014. In the Congress he has served on the Permanent Commissions of Education, where he led the discussion of reforms proposed by the Government, such as the Law of Inclusion, Teaching Career and Free Higher Education.27 Jackson also participated in the Citizen Security Commission, opposing the criminal populism of the so-called Anti-crime Short Agenda, proposing a battery of measures framed in the proposal "Crime is not a game", and then managing the creation of a commission investigating Critical neighborhoods, where the role of the police and the abandonment of the State in the most vulnerable sectors of the country were investigated.

In addition, its management was characterized by raising the levels of transparency, participation, closeness to citizens and digital activism, reporting in different parts of the District with different platforms the details of his parliamentary work, through citizen campaigns, periodic public accounts, among other actions. From 2015 until now he has been probed as one of the most important political figures in Chile. In December 2015 the survey of the Center for Public Studies (CEP), one of the most influential in the country, ranked him as the political figure with the best evaluation that year.

From 2016 onwards, Jackson has played an important role in the construction of Broad Front, a coalition that brings together various leftist political forces and citizen movements born for the last parliamentary and presidential election in 2017, and was one of the leaders that catalyzed the presidential candidacy of Beatriz Sánchez.

In the elections of November 19, 2017, Giorgio Jackson obtained the re-election obtaining more than 103 thousand votes and achieving personally 23.7% in the new District 10, becoming the most voted deputy of the parliamentary elections 2017. In this way, the Broad Front list reached more than 35% of the votes, adding to its two subpact comrades -Natalia Castillo (RD) and Gonzalo Winter (MA) - as new representatives of the coalition to Congress. In repeated occasions Jackson has announced that this would be his only re-election, commitment indicated from his first application in 2013: "I do not want to be more than two periods. I said 'a maximum re-election and I really believe it.' I see many colleagues who can be 4, 5, 6 periods, they are sitting there for more than 20 years and, I believe, inevitably, for more good intentions they have had at the beginning, they end up achanchándose (Chilean expression that means to get fat in one place).».

Jackson was the head of Gabriel Boric's 2021 presidential election. After Boric's victory, Jackson has been mentioned as a possible Interior Minister, the most relevant position in the Chilean government after the President.

Electoral record
2013 Parliamentary District 22 Deputies Elections (Santiago Centro)

Publications 
The country we dream of (2013)

Acknowledgments 

From his role as a social leader and then as a deputy, Jackson has been featured in various public, academic and political spheres. In 2011, one of the "100 young leaders" was elected, according to the ranking of El Mercurio magazine El Sábado. It was also included, in 2012, in the Global Shapers list of the World Economic Forum.

It is also part of the Red de Innovación Política Latinoamericana (Latin American Political Innovation Network)

References

External links

 
 Official website

1987 births
Living people
Presidents of the Pontifical Catholic University of Chile Student Federation
Pontifical Catholic University of Chile alumni
People from Santiago
Chilean people of English descent
Chilean people of Italian descent
Democratic Revolution politicians
Members of the Chamber of Deputies of Chile
Social leaders